Pentatoma is a genus of shield bugs in the family Pentatomidae.

Species
Species within this genus include:
 Pentatoma angulata Hsiao & Cheng
 Pentatoma illuminata
 Pentatoma japonica
 Pentatoma kunmingensis Xiong
 Pentatoma metallifera
 Pentatoma parataibaiensis Liu & Zheng, 1995
 Pentatoma rufipes (Linnaeus, 1758) – forest bug or red-legged shieldbug
 Pentatoma semiannulata
 Pentatoma viridicornuta He & Zheng, 2006

References

External links
 

Pentatomini
Pentatomidae genera